Vagn Jørgensen was a Danish sprint canoeist who competed in the late 1930s. He won a bronze in the K-2 1000 m event at the 1938 ICF Canoe Sprint World Championships in Vaxholm.

References

Danish male canoeists
Year of birth missing
Possibly living people
ICF Canoe Sprint World Championships medalists in kayak